Tropidurus spinulosus, the spiny lava lizard, is a species of lizard of the Tropiduridae family. It is found in Brazil, Bolivia, Paraguay, and Argentina.

References

Tropidurus
Reptiles described in 1862
Reptiles of Brazil
Reptiles of Bolivia
Reptiles of Paraguay
Reptiles of Argentina
Taxa named by Edward Drinker Cope